Australian Idol is an Australian talent reality television series that first aired in 2003. As of December 2008, there have been six seasons. During every season, the final round of competition features twelve singers, except for season three when it had thirteen finalists.  A total of 73 contestants have reached the finals of their season. The show's age requirements only allow people to enter if they are between 16 and 29 years of age. Out of the 73 contestants listed, 19 of them were under the age of 20, including two winners and two runners-up. Season one winner Guy Sebastian currently holds the record for the highest-selling Australian Idol album, with more than four hundred thousand copies sold in Australia.

Contestants

Notes
Contestant's age at the time the season's final round began.

References

General
 
 
 
 
 
 
Specific

External links
Official website

Australian Idol
Australian Idol